Igor Vasilyevich Danilov (born 15 August 1965) is a former Russian professional footballer.

Club career
He made his professional debut in the Soviet Top League in 1986 for FC Zenit Leningrad. He played 1 game in the UEFA Cup 1987–88 for FC Zenit Leningrad.

Honours
 USSR Federation Cup finalist: 1986.

References

1965 births
Footballers from Saint Petersburg
Living people
Soviet footballers
Russian footballers
Russian Premier League players
Veikkausliiga players
FC Zenit Saint Petersburg players
FC Shakhter Karagandy players
FC Sokol Saratov players
Soviet expatriate footballers
Russian expatriate footballers
Expatriate footballers in Finland
Expatriate footballers in Kazakhstan
Russian expatriate sportspeople in Kazakhstan
FC Mordovia Saransk players
Association football midfielders
FC Lokomotiv Saint Petersburg players